The men's 3000 metres steeplechase event at the 1975 Summer Universiade was held at the Stadio Olimpico in Rome on 21 September.

Results

References

Athletics at the 1975 Summer Universiade
1975